Jahangir Mahal, Citadel of Jahangir, Orchha Palace, Mahal-e-Jahangir Orchha, Jahangir Citadel is a citadel and garrison located in Orchha, Madhya Pradesh, India.

History
The establishment of the Jahangir Mahal dates back to the 17th century C E when the ruler of the region Vir Singh Deo built the structure as a symbol of warm reception of the Mughal Emperor Jahangir, during the latter’s first visit to the city. The entrance of the palace is marked by an artistic and traditional gateway. The front wall of the structure faces to the east and is covered with turquoise tiles. Jahangir Mahal is a three-storied structure that is marked by stylishly hanging balconies, porches, and apartments.

The domes of the Jahangir Mahal, were built according to Timurid customs; its grand Iwans are large enough to accommodate the entry of war elephants, and its high position over the landscape allowed cannons superior range.

See also
Orchha Fort complex for the larger architectural context
Pravin Rai Mahal, a subpalace

References

Bibliography
  
  

Mughal Empire
Rajput architecture
Palaces in Madhya Pradesh
Tourist attractions in Tikamgarh district
Orchha
Royal residences in India